Palmer is a town in Ellis County, Texas, United States. It is part of the Dallas–Fort Worth metroplex. Its population was 2,393 in 2020.

Geography

Palmer is located in northeastern Ellis County at  (32.429405, –96.669013). Interstate 45 passes through the east side of the town, with access from Exits 258 through 260; I-45 leads north  to downtown Dallas and south  to Ennis.

Demographics

As of the 2020 United States census, there were 2,393 people, 782 households, and 627 families residing in the town.

Culture
Portions of Tender Mercies, a 1983 film about a country western singer, were filmed in Palmer, although the majority was filmed in Waxahachie. In both towns, director Bruce Beresford deliberately filmed more barren and isolated locations that more closely resembled the West Texas area. The Texas town portrayed in Tender Mercies is never specifically identified.

Education 

Palmer has three schools: Palmer High, Middle, and Elementary School. Palmer built the current elementary school in 2015, leaving the old school for gym and cafeteria use. Palmer Elementary has over 350 students ranging from Pre-K to 3rd grade. The junior high and middle school were combined a few years earlier to become the Palmer Middle School, housing 4th grade through 8th grade, with around 350 students. Palmer High School is the second newest building and serves over 300 students between 9th and 12th grade. Palmer High School and Palmer Middle School have athletics ranging from 7th to 12th grade. Sports include track and field, basketball, football, baseball, softball, volleyball, cross country, and golf. Extracurricular activities include band, National Honor Society, and many more clubs.

Transportation

Major highways
  Interstate 45

Air
The city is served by the privately owned Dallas South Port Airport.

Photo gallery

References

External links
City of Palmer official website

Dallas–Fort Worth metroplex
Towns in Ellis County, Texas
Towns in Texas